Tanner Richard Reif (born September 9, 2005) is an American professional stock car racing driver. He competes full-time in the ARCA Menards Series West, driving the No. 16 Chevrolet SS for Bill McAnally Racing, and part-time in the ARCA Menards Series, driving the No. 16 Chevrolet SS for the same team.

Racing career

Late models 
Reif would drive full-time in the 51FIFTY Jr. Late Model Series at Madera Speedway in 2019, where he would earn several wins. That same year, he would attempt to race in the SRL Southwest Tour at the Las Vegas Motor Speedway Bullring, but would fail to qualify for it. He would return for 2020, only to drive for one race at the Irwindale Event Center. He finished 23rd due to a suspension issue. 

He would make 12 starts in the NASCAR Advance Auto Parts Weekly Series in 2020, racing at Irwindale. He earned one win, ten top tens, and four top fives, and finished 8th in the standings. He drove at Tucson Speedway in 2021 for three races, getting one win, three top tens, and two top-fives. He won at the Las Vegas Motor Speedway Bullring later that season. He would eventually drive full time in the SRL Southwest Tour in 2021. He earned eight top tens and four top-fives in 11 races and finished fourth in the standings.

ARCA Menards Series West 
On January 28, 2022, Reif would sign with Sunrise Ford Racing, to drive full time in the 2022 ARCA Menards Series West. He will be driving the 9 car, which was previously driven by Jake Drew in 2021. Reif would get his first career West Series win at Irwindale Speedway, after getting the pole and leading every lap. He earned his second win at Evergreen Speedway, the 1,000th ARCA West race, after passing his teammate, Jake Drew, with 23 laps to go.

On February 2, 2023, Bill McAnally Racing announced that Reif will drive their No. 16 car full-time in the 2023 season.

Personal life 
Tanner's younger brother, Tyler Reif, also races late models. They were both runner-ups in the 2019 51FIFTY Jr. Late Model Series. Tyler currently competes in the SRL SPEARS Southwest Tour, and is scheduled to make his ARCA Menards Series West debut at the Las Vegas Motor Speedway Bullring on October 14.

Motorsports career results

ARCA Menards Series
(key) (Bold – Pole position awarded by qualifying time. Italics – Pole position earned by points standings or practice time. * – Most laps led. ** – All laps led.)

ARCA Menards Series West

References

External links 

Living people
2005 births
ARCA Menards Series drivers
NASCAR drivers
Racing drivers from Las Vegas
Racing drivers from Nevada
Sportspeople from Las Vegas